Vittorio Chiarini (born 15 February 1937) is an Italian racing cyclist. He rode in the 1962 Tour de France.

References

External links
 

1937 births
Living people
Italian male cyclists
Place of birth missing (living people)
People from Marradi
Sportspeople from the Metropolitan City of Florence
Cyclists from Tuscany